Concussion Ensemble were an American post-rock group formed in Boston, Massachusetts in 1992. It consisted of three drummers, one percussionist (playing bedpan, horseshoe, pipes and other found objects), two guitarists and a bass player. Their music was completely instrumental and placed a strong emphasis on rhythm. The ensemble was short lived, only releasing a single and one full-length album. Other material was recorded but never officially issued. Most of the band members went on to form Coronet Premiers, another instrumental project which lessened their focus on percussion. Since 1990, percussionists Terry Donahue and Ken Winokur have formed two-thirds of the group Alloy Orchestra.

Discography
Studio albums
Stampede (1993, Conc)

External links

References

1992 establishments in Massachusetts
1994 disestablishments in Massachusetts
American post-rock groups
Musical groups established in 1992
Musical groups disestablished in 1994
Musical groups from Massachusetts